Saint Babolen (or Babolenus, Babolin, Babolein; died ) was Abbot of Saint-Maur-des-Fossés Abbey near Paris. He may have been Irish in origin.
His feast day is 26 June.

Monks of Ramsgate account

The monks of St Augustine's Abbey, Ramsgate wrote in their Book of Saints (1921),

Baring-Gould's account

Sabine Baring-Gould (1834–1924) in his Lives Of The Saints wrote under June 26,

Butler's account

The hagiographer Alban Butler (1710–1773) wrote in his Lives of the Fathers, Martyrs, and Other Principal Saints under June 26,

O'Hanlon's account

John O'Hanlon (1821–1905) wrote of Babolin in his Lives of the Irish Saints.
He noted that the nationality of the saint is doubtful, although some consider he was a Scot or Irishman.
St. Babolenus, Abbot of Fossey, in Gaul has been confused with St. Papolenus, Bishop and Abbot, first at Malmundarium and afterwards at Stabuletum in Belgium, and with another abbot called Babolenus at Bobbio.
O'Hanlon wrote,

Relics

The Chapel of Our Lady of Miracles, located next to the portico of the Church of St. Maur, was deconsecrated in 1750 and the relics of Saints Maur and Babolen were brought to the archdiocese of Paris to be distributed. The canons of St. Maur received the reliquary of St. Babolen and other items.
The parish church of St. Maur received a vertebra and a small rib of St. Babolen.
A bone from one of St. Babolen's arms went to the Chapel of St. Bond in the parish of St. Merry.
The parishes of Joui-le-Moutier and Bois-d'Arcy in Paris received three other small bones of St. Babolen.
The archbishop retained only the left tibia of St. Babolen.

Notes

Sources

 
 
 

 

7th-century Frankish saints
671 deaths